The second season of Will & Grace premiered on September 21, 1999, and concluded on May 23, 2000. It consisted of 24 episodes.

Cast and characters

Main cast 
 Eric McCormack as Will Truman
 Debra Messing as Grace Adler
 Megan Mullally as Karen Walker
 Sean Hayes as Jack McFarland

Recurring cast 
 Shelley Morrison as Rosario Salazar
 Tom Gallop as Rob
 Leigh-Allyn Baker as Ellen
 Marshall Manesh as Mr. Zamir
 Gregory Hines as Ben Doucette
 Jo Marie Payton as Mrs. Freeman

Special guest stars 
 Debbie Reynolds as Bobbi Adler
 Veronica Cartwright as Judith McFarland
 Stone Phillips as himself
 Sydney Pollack as George Truman
 Al Roker as himself
 Molly Shannon as Val Bassett
 Neil Patrick Harris as Bill
 Orson Bean as Professor Joseph Dudley
 Piper Laurie as Sharon
 Joan Collins as Helena Barnes

Guest stars 
 Shirley Prestia as Mrs. Pressman
 Lou Cutell as Mr.  Arthur Pressman
 Scott Patterson as Donald Dorio
 Peter Paige as Roger O'Neil
 Gary Grubbs as Harlin Polk
 Steve Valentine as Kai
 Tamlyn Tomita as Naomi
 Penn Badgley as Todd
 Megyn Price as Claire
 Laura Kightlinger as Nurse Sheila
 Markus Flanagan as Dr. Loranger
 Corey Parker as Josh
 Mary Pat Gleason as Sally
 Chris Potter as Michael
 Dan Bucatinsky as Neil
 Jennifer Elise Cox as Nurse Pittman
 Debra Mooney as Sister Robert
 Daryl Sabara as Broccoli Boy

Episodes

Note: the episodes on the Season 2 DVD are not in the same order as the broadcast dates shown below.

References

2
1999 American television seasons
2000 American television seasons
Television episodes directed by James Burrows